Horvat Uza is an archaeological site located in the northeast of the Negev desert in Israel. The site is located in the east of the Arad Valley and overlooks Nahal Qinah (Qinah Valley). In ancient times, forts were established there to control the wadi road, linking Judea to Arabah and the territory of Edom. It was mentioned as Qina by Josephus in book 15 of his Antiquities.

Several inscribed potsherds with inscriptions in Hebrew, dated to the 7th-century BCE, were found in Horvat Uza.

References

External links
 Photo of Horvat Uza ostracon, inscribed with the text "Ten: Menahem son of H[…]; Neryahu son of Semak[yahu]; Neryahu son of Mishk[an]ya[hu]; Netanyahu son of Hoteb; Uriyahu son of Shelem[yahu]; Gedalyahu son of Uriyah[u]; Yadinyahu son of Shephat[yahu]; Hoduyahu son of […]."

Ancient sites in Israel
Former populated places in Southwest Asia
Iron Age sites in Israel
Establishments in the Kingdom of Judah